Tanja Manuela Sadow is a Singapore educator and founder of the Jewellery Design and Management International School

Early life and education
Tanja studied in Spain, the United Kingdom and attended the Gemological Institute of America in the United States of America. Her training included various forms of design and she is a graduate Jewellery Gemmologist.

Career
From 1984 to 1991, Tanja was a resident and extension instructor at the Gemological Institute of America, training jewellers in their Santa Monica campus as well as in 48 US States and conducting GIA's first extension course in Singapore

In 1991, Tanja consulted with the Singapore Economic Development Board, recommending the development of a Singapore-based education facility for the jewellery industry. Later she was commissioned to develop the gemmology curriculum for the newly formed Jewellery Industry Training Centre of Singapore (JITCS). She continued to develop training programmes and deliver gemmology and jewellery training to the Singapore jewellery industry with the JITCS until December 1994.

In 1995, Tanja established a commercial company, JusTanja Pte. Ltd. which she would use to design and distribute jewellery lines in Singapore, Los Angeles and London, stocked by notable department stores such as Harrods of London. Through this company, She also delivered corporate training to Singapore jewellery firms and raised awareness about gemstones and jewellery with Singapore clubs and communities.

Tanja established the retail brand BeadHub. Between 2000 and 2006, Beadhub grew from a single member only location to a multi-outlet component and finished jewellery chain in Singapore with locations in Wisma Atria, Emerald Hill Road and Sunshine Plaza as well as a unique DIY jewellery concession within Robinson & Co. in The Centrepoint. The BeadHub brand was sold in 2006 following Tanja's desire to pursue the development of a formal training institution.

In 2007 Tanja founded the Jewellery Design and Management International School in Singapore. She continues to head this organization in the capacity of executive director and dean of the school.

Activities
Tanja is founder and president of the Guild of Jewellery Professionals and Artisans, a not-for-profit society registered in Singapore, and an executive committee member of the Singapore Jewellers Association, a not-for-profit association registered in Singapore.

She regularly delivers public talks and workshops both in Singapore and the Asia-Pacific region to promote jewellery appreciation and interest in the jewellery industry. She also works with international brands to provide educational content to support their outreach activities. She also provides authoritative viewpoints for press articles in Singapore and around the world.

Tanja has been a judge at local and international jewellery design competitions, including the Singapore Jewellery Design Award

Awards
She has received the following awards:

References

External links
 Biography on JDMIS Website
 
 Guild of Jewellery Professionals and Artisans 

Jewellery designers
Singaporean educators
Women educators
Design educators
British art teachers
Living people
Year of birth missing (living people)